Neil Turley (born 15 March 1980) is an English former professional rugby league footballer who played in the 1990s and 2000s.

Early career
Neil started his career as a junior with Wigan Warriors, coming through their Academy set-up. As an Academy player he starred in the 1998 Academy Grand Final for Wigan in their defeat by Leeds Rhinos, who boasted such international stars as Kevin Sinfield and Rob Burrow.

His senior career was unlikely to prosper at Wigan as Turley played understudy to Great Britain   Kris Radlinski. Turley took the offer in 2000 to join Second Division side Leigh Centurions. Neil's father, Norman Turley, was Leigh's assistant coach. After an impressive debut in a friendly game against Australia's South Sydney Rabbitohs in late 2000, Turley was selected as Leigh's starting  ahead of Simon Svabic.

Debut season
His debut season as a senior player in 2001 saw Turley smash the world record for tries by a full back, ending the season with 55. He also gained representative honours, playing in both England under-21 Tests against South Africa, and played for Lancashire as the only player from a non-Super League club to play in the Origin series against rivals Yorkshire. His debut season featured a surprising Challenge Cup victory over Super League neighbours Salford City Reds, and saw Leigh finish nine points clear at the top of the Northern Ford Premiership and claim the short-lived Trans-Pennine Cup. Turley was the target of Warrington Wolves who tabled an offer to the Leigh club but Turley turned it down. However, the fantastic year was marred as defeat by Oldham in the play-off semi-final eventually saw the Widnes Vikings go onto win the Grand Final, and a place in the Super League.

Records
Turley broke many club records, including goals in a season and points in a season. Yet the ultimate prize, Grand Final success, eluded Leigh. In 2002 and 2003, the relegated Super League sides, Huddersfield Giants and Salford City Reds remained fully professional teams. Thus, their full-time fitness and coaching led to defeat in successive Grand Finals for Leigh. When Halifax were relegated to play in the 2004 National League competition, their financial troubles meant they were unable to retain a full-time team and struggled, paving the way for Leigh to go about achieving their dream. Leigh defeated Whitehaven 32-16 after over-time to finally attain Super League status for 2005's Super League X.

Retirement
Turley announced his retirement in April 2006, due to a serious recurring back injury. He made 122 appearances for Leigh, scoring 1,501 points, including 132 tries.

Career Statistics

References

1980 births
Living people
English rugby league players
Lancashire rugby league team players
Leigh Leopards players
Rugby league five-eighths
Rugby league fullbacks